Magic Rock is a 2001 comedy-drama film written by Bradley Gallo and directed by Bradley Gallo and Aditya Chandora.

Background
Gallo wrote the film's screenplay while a psychology student at Pennsylvania State University.  Gallo based parts of the Magic Rock on his own 15 Summers spent at Camp Cody For Boys in Freedom, New Hampshire when a boy, and filmed the project on locations in Lake Ossipee, New Hampshire.  Prior to its screening at the Stony Brook Film Festival on July 18, 2001, The New York Times wrote that "The idea for Magic Rock was inspired by Mr. Gallo's own experiences at sleep-away camp. The fictitious Camp Kobie was based on Camp Cody, on the shores of Ossipee Lake in New Hampshire, where Mr. Gallo spent 12 summers."

The film won the 'Best Cinematography Award' at the 2001 Angel Citi Film Festival in Los Angeles.

Plot  
When a beloved Summer Camp director dies, the popular boys' haven will be closed by the heartless attorney who inherits it unless a dedicated young camp counselor can change his mind over one last summer, with the comic help of his oddball campers.

Partial cast 

 Bradley Gallo as T.J. 
 Adam Busch as Kyle 
 Miko Hughes as Jesse 
 Joanna Wasick as Liberty 
 Tom Delaney as Bud 
 Erik Parillo as Richard 
 Kimberly Jay Thomas as Eve 

 Edward Winrow as Bob Rosenberg 
 Eli Gelb as Mookie 
 Jimmy McQuaid as Cody 
 Ross Gallo as Blake 
 Daryl Wein as Tanner 
 Thomas Magnani as Zach

Recognition

Awards & nomination
 'Best Cinematography' - 2001 Angel Citi Film Festival

References

External links
 

2001 films
2001 comedy-drama films
American comedy-drama films
American independent films
2001 independent films
2000s English-language films
2000s American films